Dannevirke Aerodrome  is a small airport located 2 nautical miles (3.7 km) south southwest of Dannevirke in the Tararua District in the North Island of New Zealand.

Operational Information 
Runway Strength:
02/20: ESWL 8000
08/26: ESWL 3630
No runway lighting available
Circuit Fixed Wing:
Runways 20, 26 – Left Hand
Runways 02, 08 – Left Hand
Circuit Heilcopters:
Runways 02, 08 - Left Hand
Runways 20, 26 – Left Hand

Sources 
NZAIP Volume 4 AD
New Zealand AIP

Airports in New Zealand
Buildings and structures in Manawatū-Whanganui
Transport in Manawatū-Whanganui
Dannevirke
Transport buildings and structures in Manawatū-Whanganui